Casanova Elvo is a comune (municipality) in the Province of Vercelli in the Italian region Piedmont, located about  northeast of Turin and about  northwest of Vercelli.

Casanova Elvo borders the following municipalities: Collobiano, Formigliana, Olcenengo, San Germano Vercellese, Santhià, and Villarboit.

References

Cities and towns in Piedmont